The 2021–22 season will be the 100th season in the existence of R.F.C. Seraing (1922) and the club's first season back in the top flight of Belgian football. In addition to the domestic league, R.F.C. Seraing (1922) will participate in this season's edition of the Belgian Cup.

Players

First-team squad

Pre-season and friendlies

Competitions

Overall record

Belgian First Division A

League table

Results summary

Results by round

Matches
The league fixtures were announced on 8 June 2021.

Relegation play-off

Belgian Cup

References

RFC Seraing